is one of the original 40 throws of Judo as developed by Jigoro Kano. It belongs to the third group,
Sankyo, of the traditional throwing list, Gokyo (no waza), of Kodokan Judo. It is also part of the current 67 Throws of Kodokan Judo.
It is classified as a side sacrifice technique, Yoko-sutemi.

Included systems 
Systems:
Kodokan Judo, Judo Lists
Lists:
The Canon Of Judo
Judo technique

Similar techniques, variants, and aliases 
English aliases:
Side drop
Similar techniques

 Uki waza
 Yoko otoshi
 Tani otoshi

Somehow related

 Yoko wakare
Tama Guruma
A throw developed by Kyuzo Mifune and described in The Canon Of Judo.
It is also shown in the video, The Essence of Judo.
It is currently not recognized by the Kodokan.

References 
 

Judo technique
Throw (grappling)